The Shamaldy-Say Hydro Power Plant is an active hydro power plant on the river Naryn between Tash-Kömür and Shamaldy-Say, in Kyrgyzstan. Completed between 1992 and 1996, it is one of the three hydro power plants on the river Naryn near Tash-Kömür, 14 km downstream from the Tash-Kömür Hydroelectric Power Station. It has 3 individual turbines with a nominal output of around 80 MW and a total nominal capacity of 180 MW.

References

Hydroelectric power stations in Kyrgyzstan
Dams in Kyrgyzstan
Dams completed in 1996
Dams on the Naryn River